Goodenia havilandii, commonly known as hill goodenia, is a species of flowering plant in the family Goodeniaceae and is endemic to the drier parts of southern Australia. It is a prostrate to ascending, short-lived herb with sticky leaves and racemes of yellowish flowers with a brown centre.

Description
Flowering occurs in most months and the fruit is a more or less spherical capsule  in diameter.

Taxonomy
Goodenia havilandii was first formally described in 1913 by Joseph Maiden and Ernst Betche in the Proceedings of the Linnean Society of New South Wales. The specific epithet (havilandii) honours Archdeacon Francis Ernest Haviland (1859–1945), an amateur botanist. In 1990, Roger Carolin selected the specimens collected by Haviland near Cobar in 1911 as the lectotype.

Distribution and habitat
This goodenia in drier areas of southern Australia, from the inland areas of New South Wales to the southern Northern Territory, Queensland, South Australia and Western Australia.

References

havilandii
Flora of New South Wales
Eudicots of Western Australia
Flora of Queensland
Flora of South Australia
Flora of the Northern Territory
Taxa named by Joseph Maiden
Taxa named by Ernst Betche
Plants described in 1913
Endemic flora of Australia